Stone Fort is the name of two townships or precincts in the U.S. state of Illinois:

 Stone Fort Township, Saline County, Illinois
 Stonefort Precinct, Williamson County, Illinois

Illinois township disambiguation pages